Shyu Jyuo-min is a Taiwanese engineer and politician. He was the Minister of Science and Technology from 23 January 2015 until 20 May 2016.

Education
Shyu obtained his bachelor's and master's degrees in electrical engineering from National Taiwan University in 1977 and 1979, respectively. He then obtained his doctoral degree in electrical engineering from University of California, Berkeley in the United States in 1988.

Early career
In 1981–1984, Shyu worked as a researcher at Matsushita Electric Industrial Co., Ltd. In 2000–2001, he became the director-general of the SoC Technology Center of Industrial Technology Research Institute (ITRI) and as director-general of Electronics Research and Service Organization of ITRI in 2000–2004. In 2003–2007, he became the executive vice president of ITRI. In 2007–2010, he was the dean of the College of Electrical Engineering and Computer Sciences of National Tsing Hua University and in 2009-2010 as the vice chancellor of University System of Taiwan.

Minister of Science and Technology

Ministry appointment
On 23 January 2015, the Executive Yuan appointed Shyu to be the Minister of Science and Technology, replacing former Minister Chang San-cheng.

References

Living people
Ministers of Science and Technology of the Republic of China
National Taiwan University alumni
Year of birth missing (living people)